The 1987/88 FIS Freestyle Skiing World Cup was the ninth World Cup season in freestyle skiing organised by International Ski Federation. The season started on 11 December 1987 and ended on 20 March 1988. This season included four disciplines: aerials, moguls, ballet and combined.

Men

Moguls

Ballet

Aerials

Combined

Ladies

Moguls

Ballet

Aerials

Combined

Men's standings

Overall 

Standings after 40 races.

Moguls 

Standings after 10 races.

Aerials 

Standings after 10 races.

Ballet 

Standings after 10 races.

Combined 

Standings after 10 races.

Ladies' standings

Overall 

Standings after 40 races.

Moguls 

Standings after 10 races.

Aerials 

Standings after 10 races.

Ballet 

Standings after 10 races.

Combined 

Standings after 10 races.

References

FIS Freestyle Skiing World Cup
World Cup
World Cup